Hasanabad-e Mir Hashemi (also Romanized as Ḩasanābād-e Mīr Hāshemī; also known as Ḩasanābād) is a village in Akhtarabad Rural District, in the Central District of Malard County, Tehran Province, Iran. At the 2006 census, its population was 18, in 4 families.

References 

Populated places in Malard County